Lazzaroni is an Italian surname. Notable people with the surname include:

David Lazzaroni (born 1985), French ski jumper
Franco Lazzaroni (born 1988), Argentine footballer
Giovanni Battista Lazzaroni, Italian Baroque painter
Marco Lazzaroni (born 1995), Italian rugby union player
Stefania Lazzaroni, Italian long jumper

Italian-language surnames